Clete is a given name. Notable people with the name include:

Greek mythological figures:
Clete or Cleta, one of the Charites
Clete (Amazon), companion of Penthesilea
Astronomy:
385695 Clete, a minor planet
People:
Clete Blakeman (born 1965), official in the National Football League since the 2008 NFL season
Clete Boyer (1937–2007), Major League Baseball player
Clete Donald Johnson, Jr.
Clete Roberts (1912–1984), pioneer in Los Angeles local broadcast journalism
Clete Thomas (born 1983), A Major League Baseball outfielder previously with the Detroit Tigers organization, now a part of the Minnesota Twins

See also
Klete Keller (born 1982), American freestyle swimmer and Olympic medallist
Cleat (disambiguation)
Crete, Greek island